Luke Young (born 8 September 1978) is an Australian sprint canoeist who competed in the early 2000s. At the 2000 Summer Olympics in Sydney, he was eliminated in the semifinals of the K-2 1000 m even.

References
Sports-Reference.com profile

1978 births
Australian male canoeists
Canoeists at the 2000 Summer Olympics
Living people
Olympic canoeists of Australia